Chitkara University is a private university located in Rajpura, Punjab, India. It offers undergraduate programs, post-graduate program and doctoral programs in fields of engineering, management, pharmacy, health sciences, nursing, hospitality, art & design and education. It was established and is managed by the Chitkara Educational Trust.

History 
Chitkara University, Punjab started its way as Chitkara Institute of Engineering and Technology established in 2002 and affiliated to Punjab Technical University. The university was established in 2010 after being granted university status with the passing of The Chitkara University Act, 2008 in 2009.

Chitkara's 50 acre main campus is located 33.1 km from Chandigarh.

Academics

Affiliations
Chitkara University is recognized by the University Grants Commission (UGC). Relevant programmes are approved by the Council of Architecture (COA), Pharmacy Council of India (PCI), National Council for Teacher Education (NCTE), Indian Nursing Council (INC) and National Council for Hotel Management and Catering Technology (NCHMCT).

Rankings

Chitkara University was ranked in the 151–200 band among universities in India by National Institutional Ranking Framework (NIRF) in 2020, 38 in the pharmacy ranking and 75 in the management ranking and 181 in the Engineering ranking.

Internationally, the university was ranked in the 401–600 band out of 768 universities in the Times Higher Education World University Rankings Impact Rankings 2020.

Schools and Institutes 

The university includes:
 Chitkara Business School
 Chitkara College of Sales & Marketing
 Chitkara University Institute of Engineering & Technology
 Chitkara University School of Maritime Studies
 Chitkara College of Applied Engineering
 Chitkara School of Planning and Architecture
 Chitkara Design School
 Chitkara School of Mass Communication
 Chitkara College of Hospitality Management
 Chitkara College of Pharmacy
 Chitkara School of Health Sciences
 Chitkara Law School
 Chitkara College of Education
 Centre for Global Education

Student life 
Chitkara University hosts chapters of the Association Internationale des Étudiants en Sciences Économiques et Commerciales (AIESEC), Institute of Electrical Engineers (IEEE), Association for Computing Machinery (ACM), Institution of Electronics and Telecommunication Engineers (IETE), Institution of Engineers (India) (IEI), Society of Automotive Engineers India (SAE India) and Computer Society of India (CSI).

See also 
 Chitkara University, Himachal Pradesh

References

External links 

Universities in Punjab, India
Private universities in India
Educational institutions established in 2010
2010 establishments in Punjab, India